Michel Turler (May 14, 1944 – April 8, 2010) was a former Swiss professional ice hockey forward who played for HC La Chaux-de-Fonds and EHC Biel in the National League A.  He also represented the Swiss national team at the 1972 Winter Olympics.

References

External links
Michel Turler's stats at Sports-Reference.com

1944 births
2010 deaths
EHC Biel players
HC La Chaux-de-Fonds players
Neuchâtel Young Sprinters HC players
Ice hockey players at the 1972 Winter Olympics
Olympic ice hockey players of Switzerland
Swiss ice hockey centres